Kim Levin is an American art critic and writer. Levin was a regular contributor to The Village Voice from 1982 to 2006. Since 2007 she has been contributing regularly to ARTnews.

Levin worked as a correspondent to Opus International from 1973-1977. From 1980-1994, she was a correspondent at Flash Art. She also worked as a contributing editor for Arts Magazine from 1973-1992. Levin has also contributed to the publications; Parkett, Artstudio, Sculpture and VOIR, among others. Her essays are also in books and exhibition catalogues. Kim Levin received a B.A. from Vassar College and an M.A. in Egyptian Archaeology from Columbia University, Department of Art History and Architecture. She continued PhD course work at the New York University Institute of Fine Arts.

Levin has lectured in the U.S. and internationally at: the Guggenheim Museum,  The New School for Social Research, Barnard College, Brown University, the São Paulo Art Biennial, the Whitney Museum of American Art, the Museum of Contemporary Art, Chicago, the California Institute of the Arts, the Cincinnati Center of Contemporary Art, and other institutions.
Levin was Treasurer of AICA-USA (Association international des critiques d’art) from 1982-1984, Vice President from 1984-1990, and President from 1990-1992. She became Vice President of AICA International in 1991 and was elected President in 1996 for two terms, ending in 2002.

In 2002, an installation of Levin’s preliminary notes written on press releases and gallery announcements, appeared in the solo exhibition “Notes and Itineraries,” at Delta Axis, Memphis, curated and installed by the artist John Salvest. The show was re-conceived at Ronald Feldman Fine Arts, New York (2006), and then traveled internationally to Haas & Meyer, Zurich (2006), The Ludwig Museum, Budapest (2007), KIASMA, Helsinki (2008) and was included in the group show “Retracing Exhibitions” curated by Kari Conte and Florence Ostendat at the Royal College of Art, London (2009).

Exhibitions curated
 “Arnold Mesches: A Life’s Work,” retrospective including 88 paintings, collages, and drawings from 1945 to 2013. Miami-Dade Museum of Art and Design, February–May 2013.
 Printed Project, Issue 7, Summer 2007, “Unconditional Love” an exhibition in the form of a magazine.
 Commissioner, first Busan Biennale 2003 (co-curated).
 “Waterworks”, Nordiska Akvarellmuseet, Skärhamn, Sweden. 2001.
 “John Salvest: Time on his Hands”, Phoenix Art Museum, October 12, 1999 – January 23, 2000.
 “Max 98”, Art Museum of the University of Memphis. 1998.
 “Dui Seid: Artist’s Estate” Karl Ernst Osthaus-Museum, Hagen, 1997. (Co-curated by Michael Fehr)
 “Borealis 8: The Scream”, ARKEN Museum of Modern Art Copenhagen, November 16, 	1996- January 17, 1997. The Nordic Biennial and The Main Exhibition of the Nordic Fine Arts Year, Copenhagen, 1996.
 Gwangju Biennale (1st), Gwangju, Korea, September- November 1995. (advisor)
 “Configura 2; Dialogue of Cultures” at Fischmarkt Galerie, Haus dem Kronbacken, and other historic sites, Erfurt, Germany, June 10 – September 10, 1995. (co-curator)
 “Drucksache: Prints and Issues,” Kunstwerke, Berlin, April 26-June 27, 1993.
 “Tema: AIDS”, Henie-Onstad Kunstsenter, Hovikodden, Norway, May 7 – June 20, 1993 (chief curator, co-curators Per Hovdenakk, Herloff Hatlebrekker, Sven Christiansen).
 “Translation,” Center for Contemporary Art Ujazdowski Castle, Warsaw, Poland, June 26 – August 2, 1992.
 “Warhol & Basquiat: Samo & Andy”, Sonje Museum of Contemporary Art, Kyongju, Korea, September 14- October 20, 1991. And National Museum of Contemporary Art, Seoul, Korea, November 1–30, 1991.
 “Contemporary American Art”, Museum of Modern Art, Seibu Takanawa, Japan. September 10 – November 3, 1988.
 “Contemporary Art from New York,” Ho-Am Gallery, Seoul, Korea, July 15-August 23, 1988.

Publications
Kim Levin has contributed to the following publications:

Selected bibliography
 2004. 500 års verdenskunst, “Par i rødt” (Louise Bourgeois: The Red Room) / Gylendal Nordisk Forlag, Copenhagen, (co-edited by Holger Reenberg, Torben Weirup).
 2001. Modern Art in The USA: Issues and Controversies of the 20th Century, “Farewall to Modernism”, edited by Patricia Hills, Prentice Hall. 
 2000. TransPlant: Living Vegetation in Contemporary Art. (Co-Author, Thomas von Taschitzki), Edited by Barbara Nemitz). Hatje Cantz, Germany 2000.
 1999. Art Planet: A Global View of Art Criticism (The Journal of AICA). Initiated and Co-edited, Vol. 1., No. 0.  
 1996. Regina Silveira: Cartografias de Sombra. “Art in Absentia”, EdUSP Universidad de Sap Paulo. 
 1995. Strategies for Survival-Now! “Identity Crisis Update:The End of Modernism and the Issue of Cultural Identity, edited by Christian Chambert, The Swedish Art Critics Associated Press, Sweden. 
 1994. Sol LeWitt Testi Critici. “Il Contratto del Disegnatore”, Incontri Internazionali d'Arte Rome.
 1990. Beyond Walls and Wars: Art, Politics, and Multiculturalism. Edited and with an introduction by Kim Levin. Midmarch Press, New York.
 1992. Energy Plan for the Western Man: Joseph Beuys in America. Introduction by Kim Levin, edited by Karin Cuoni, Four Walls Eight Windows, New York.
 1989. Collage: Critical Views. Foreword by Kim Levin, edited by Katherine Hoffman, U.M.I. Research Press, Ann Arbor & London.
 1988. Beyond Modernism: Essays on Art From the 70s and 80s. Harper and Row, New York.
 1986. An American Renaissance: Painting and Sculpture since 1940, “Appropriating the Past, Neo Expressionsim, Neo Primitivism and the Revival of Abstraction”, Abbeville Press, New York. 
 1976. New Artists Video, “Video Art in the TV Landscape”, edited by Gregory Battock, Dutton, New York.
 1975. Super Realism, “Malcom Morley: Post Illusionism” and “The Ersatz Object”, edited by Gregory Battock, Dutton, New York. 
  1975. Lucas Samaras'', (monograph) Harry N. Abrams Art Books, New York.

Selected museum catalogue essays
 Brandon Ballengee: Augures d’innocence, “Brandon Ballengee: On the Devolution of Species.” Chateau du Chamarande, Les Editions Domaine du Chamarande, MMXIV, 2013.
 Kim Jones: “The Averno Drawings,” Pierogi, Brooklyn, 2012.
 Mamma Andersson: “Under the Influence,” Moderna Museet Stockholm, Steidl. 2007.
 Leon Taracewicz, “Absolute Landscape,” Edited by Milada Slizinska, Center for Contemporary Art Ujazdowski Castle, Warsaw, 2003.
 Bettina Rheims: Retrospective, “Bettina Rheims: The Vulnerable Image” Schirmer/Mosel München. Helsinki,  2003. .
 Nedko Solakov, “Nedko Solakov: The Potential of Peripheries”, Centre for Contemporary Art Ujazdowski Castle, September 2000.
 Organizing Freedom: Nordic Art of the '90s, “Nothing Left to Lose”, Moderna Museet, Stockholm, 2000.
 Pierre et Gilles, “Pierre et Gilles; the Ecstatic Image”, a conversation between Berndt Arell and Kim Levin, Turku Art Museum, Finland, 1999-2000.
 Time Migration: Techno-Art for the New Millenium, “Future Obsolete”, Taipei Cultural Center, New York, Dec 3rd 1999.
 Irish Art Now: From the Poetic to the Political, “Poetics, Politics, and Irish Art: Thirteen Questions”, Independent Curators International in association with the Irish Museum of Modern Art, Dublin, 1999.
Luca Buvoli, “Not-a-Superhero, I presume?,” Temporanea, Caffe’ Florian, Venice, Italy catalog text for Venice Biennale, 1997.
 Jon Kessler's Asia, “Empire of Images, Cabinet of Signs”, Kestner Gessellschaft Hanover, 1995.
 Peinture. Emblemes et References, “la Volaille de Rauschenberg”, capcMusee d'art 	contemporain de Bordeaux. 1993-1994.
 Allan Wexler, “Allan Wexler: Structures for Reflection”, Karl Ernst Osthaus Museum, Hagen. 1993.
 Tema AIDS: Crisis of the Body: Art in the Age of AIDS, Henie-Onstad Kunstsenter, Hovikodden, 1993
 Dark Décor, “Beyond Horror Vacuii: The Politics of Pattern”, ICI (Independent Curators Incorporated), a traveling exhibition. 1992-93.
 Counterbalance, “Art that Makes Itself: An Essay on Sol Le Witt and Jean Tinguely”, The Hans and Walter Bechtler Gallery, Charlotte, North Carolina, 1991.
 Warhol & Basquiat, “Samo & Andy”, Sonje Museum of Contemporary Art, Kyungu, Korea, 1991.
 Glass: Material in the Service of Meaning,”Transparent Contradictions”, Tacoma Art Museum, Tacoma, Washington, 1991.
 Lucas Samaras 1961-1991, Yokohama Museum of Art, October – November, 1991.
 Europe Unknown, Palac Sztuki TPSP, WKS Wawel, Cracow, Poland, 1991. (Volume 2)
 Dialogue Prague/Los Angeles, Santa Monica Museum, California, 1990.
 IRWIN, “Slovene PostModern” Cleveland State University Art Gallery, 1990.
 Art/Artifact, “Bring Em Back Alive.” The Center for African Art, New York, 1989. (2nd Edition).
 Wegman’s World, “William Wegman's Videos: Funny Instead of Formal”, Walker Art Center, Minneapolis, 1982–83.
 Dui Seid: Artist’s Estate, “Blood Relations,” Karl Ernst Osthaus-Museum, Hagen,  Neuer Folkwang Verlag, Hagen, 1987.
 Rafael Ferrer, “In the Torrid Zone”, Laguna Gloria Museum, Austin, Texas, 1982.
 Pablo Picasso; Das Spatwerk 1964–1972, Kunstmuseum, Basel, 1981.
 Mac Adams Mysteries, Welsh Arts Council, Cardiff and London, 1979.
 The Angel of Mercy, La Jolla Museum of Contemporary Art, California, 1977. (Eleanor Antin)

Selected articles

Awards and honors
 Fellow, USC Annenberg-Getty Journalism Program, November 2011.
 Fellow, USC Annenberg-Getty Arts Fellowship Program, 2004.
 Juror, UNESCO Prize for the Advancement of Art in Cooperation with AICA, Cairo Biennale, 1998.
 Chair of Jury, UNESCO Prize for the Advancement of Art, Paris, 1995.
 SECA Fellowship, San Francisco Museum of Modern Art, 1993.
 First Place, Contemporary Art, Fifth Annual Manufacturers Hanover Art/World Award for Distinguished Newspaper Art Criticism, 1986.
 Visual Arts Panelist for Critic Grants, National Endowment for the Arts, 1981.

Exhibitions
 Ronald Feldman Fine Arts]. January 7-February 4, 2006.
 The New York Times, January 18, 2006
 Kim Levin. The New Yorker. February 6, 2006.
 “Remembering Exhibitions” Royal College of Art, London, March 2009.

External links
 Biography, Brooklyn Rail.
 Engine 29 Biography
 USC Annenberg/Getty Arts Journalism Program 2011. Fellow Biographies.
 “Re:Art Criticism Today”, The Brooklyn Rail. December 20, 2012.
 University of Florida College of the Arts. Tuesday February 28, 2012.

References

American art critics
American art curators
American women curators
Living people
New York University Institute of Fine Arts alumni
Vassar College alumni
Columbia Graduate School of Arts and Sciences alumni
Year of birth missing (living people)
21st-century American women